Kulamavu Saddle Dam (RIght Bank) is an Earthen Dam constructed across Kilivallithodu at Arakkulam village in Idukki District of Kerala, India. It is One of the two saddle dams constructed to augment Idukki reservoir. It is a Rolled earth filled dam which has no Spillways or river outlets

Specifications

Location	Latitude:9⁰48’5”N
Longitude:76⁰53’E	
Panchayath	Arakkulam
Village	Arakkulam
District	Idukki
River Basin	Periyar	
River	Kilivallithodu
Release from Dam to river	NA
Taluk through which release flows	NA
Year of completion	1977	
Name of Project	Idukki HEP
Purpose of Project	Hydro Power	
Project Identification Code ( PIC)	Nil
Dam Features
Type of Dam	Rolled earth fill	
Classification	: Saddle Dam
Maximum Water Level (MWL)	EL 2408.50 ft. ( 734.30 m)
Full Reservoir Level ( FRL)	EL 2403.00 ft. ( 732.62 m)
Storage at FRL	1996.30 Mm3
Height from deepest foundation	
Length	
Spillway	No spillway
Crest Level	NA
River Outlet	Nil

References

Dams in Kerala
Dams completed in 1977
20th-century architecture in India